Kénold Versailles (born March 24, 1984 in Carrefour) is a Haitian footballer who, from 2011–2012, played for Rochester Rhinos in the USL Professional Division.

Career

Professional
Versailles played youth soccer at the Centre for Kids, which was sponsored by the Haitian Ministry of Sports, from 1999 to 2003. He then played six years in Division 1 Ligue Haitienne, the top league in Haiti, winning the league Clôture title in 2002 with Racing Club Haïtien, and starring for Roulado from 2006 to 2007.

Versailles was signed with the Vancouver Whitecaps of the USL First Division on January 10, 2009 and was released on 27 November 2009. On March 9, 2010, Crystal Palace Baltimore announced the signing of Versailles to a contract for the 2010 season.

In early June 2010, having failed to break into the Crystal Palace Baltimore first team on a regular basis, Versailles signed with Balrimore's divisional rivals Rochester Rhinos.

International
Versailles was a member of several Haitian national youth teams, participating in qualifying games for the 2001 FIFA U-17 World Championship in Trinidad and Tobago  and the 2003 FIFA World Youth Championship United Arab Emirates. He was also a member of the U-23 Olympic team in 2004 before earning five caps at senior international level.

Career statistics
(correct as of 16 April 2010)

Honors

Rochester Rhinos
USSF Division 2 Pro League Regular Season Champions (1): 2010

Racing Club Haïtien
Haitian League Clôture Champions (1): 2002

References

External links
Vancouver Whitecaps bio

1984 births
Living people
Haitian footballers
Haiti international footballers
USL League Two players
USL First Division players
Vancouver Whitecaps (1986–2010) players
Vancouver Whitecaps Residency players
Crystal Palace Baltimore players
Rochester New York FC players
USSF Division 2 Professional League players
USL Championship players
Expatriate soccer players in Canada
Expatriate soccer players in the United States
Association football midfielders